Archaeopithecus is an extinct genus of Notoungulate, belonging to the suborder Typotheria. It lived during the Middle Eocene, in what is today Argentina.

Description

This animal is mostly known from several cranial remains, including an almost complete skull, teeth and mandibles. Comparison with some of its better known relatives allows to portray a small animal, somewhat similar with rodents, and weighing less than two kilograms. The snout was higher than in Notopithecus, with a longer rostrum ; the mandible was short and thick, with a particularly massive, short and broad mandibular symphysis. The tympanic bullae were modestly sized.

Archaeopithecus had conical incisors, similar to its canines, and triangular-shaped upper premolars, devoid of hypocone. The premolars and molars had a strong parastyle and a paracone fold. Unlike other Eocene notoungulates such as Notopithecus and Oldfieldthomasia, which had low-crowned teeth, Archaeopithecus had a near-hypsodont (high-crowned) dentition, with short diastemas between the anterior teeth. The teeth of Archaeopithecus show an important occlusal variability during growth, associated with a variations caused by wear in the size of the teeth : with the progress of dental wear, the upper molars became wider, while the lower molars became broad and short.

Classification

The type species, Archaeopithecus rongeri, was first described in 1897 by Florentino Ameghino. It is known from various fossils discovered in Middle Eocene terrains of Argentina. More recently, other species of small notoungulates from the same terrains were described, including Acropithecus tersus and Archaeopithecus rigidus. Several studies tried subsequently to shed light on their taxonomic confusion ; a recent review of their fossil materials indicates that all those species are most probably synonymous with the type species.

Archaeopithecus and Acropithecus were initially described by Ameghino as primitive monkeys, hence their name, Archaeopithecus ("archaic monkey") and Acropithecus ("highest monkey"), but were later correctly attributed to the order Notoungulata. There is still doubts over the real relationships of this genus within Notoungulata ; it is often placed, with its relative Teratopithecus, within the family Archaeopithecidae, sometimes including the better known genus Notopithecus, and characterized by the characteristic conical incisors and canines and the near hypsodont molars. It may have been an archaic member of the suborder Typotheria, a group of rodent-like notoungulates.

References

F. Ameghino. 1897. Mammiféres crétacés de l’Argentine (Deuxième contribution à la connaissance de la fauna mammalogique de couches à Pyrotherium) [Cretaceous mammals of Argentina (second contribution to the knowledge of the mammalian fauna of the Pyrotherium Beds)]. Boletin Instituto Geografico Argentino 18(4–9):406-521 
F. Ameghino. 1904. Nuevas especies de mamíferos, cretáceos y terciarios de la República Argentina [New species of mammals, Cretaceous and Tertiarty, from the Argentine Republic]. Anales de la Sociedad Cientifica Argentina 56–58:1-142
G. G. Simpson. 1967. The beginning of the age of mammals in South America. Part II. Bulletin of the American Museum of Natural History 137:1-260
B. Vera. 2016. Phylogenetic revision of the South American notopithecines (Mammalia: Notoungulata). Journal of Systematic Palaeontology 14:461-480.

Typotheres
Eocene mammals of South America
Paleogene Argentina
Fossils of Argentina
Taxa named by Florentino Ameghino
Fossil taxa described in 1897
Prehistoric placental genera
Golfo San Jorge Basin
Sarmiento Formation